Riji are the pearl shells traditionally worn by Aboriginal men in the north-west part of Australia, around present day Broome. The word riji is from the Bardi language. Another word for it is  jakuli.

Rijis are worn as pubic coverings, like a loin cloth, and attached with hairstring from a belt or band around the waist. Only men initiated to the highest degree could traditionally wear them. Today special ceremonies mark the occasion when boys are given riji to mark their transition to adulthood, a time of great joy for families. 

Before being decorated, the pearl shell is known as guwan. Lines known as ramu, often in a sacred pattern or depicting a traditional story, are carved onto the guwan, at which point it becomes a riji. Ochre is sometimes applied to the incisions, for colour.   Riji are associated with water, as well as spiritual or healing powers, and life. Bardi people equate the light reflecting off the shells to lightning flashes, which are prominent during the monsoon, and to lights flashing off the cheeks of the Rainbow Serpent, who is closely linked to water and rain.

One of the unique patterns used in the Kimberley region of Western Australia is a pattern of interlocking designs. The incised designs are highlighted with a mixture of ochre and Spinifex resin, which is rubbed into the grooves. Decorated and plain pearl shells are used for rain-making and magical purposes or for trade.

Riji were objects of great value and were traded with inland Aboriginal people along ancient trade routes over vast areas of the continent. They have been found at Yuendumu in the desert, south-eastern Arnhem Land, Queensland and South Australia. 

Often plain pearl shells were decorated further along trade routes, far from their place of origin.

Aboriginal artists Aubrey Tigan and Butcher Joe Nangan created riji out of mother-of-pearl buttons and cloth. Artists still make Riji today in the Broome area. Some use the older, sacred patterns, while others choose to use more modern designs.

References

http://www.nga.gov.au/Exhibition/Tactility/Detail.cfm?IRN=83544

Australian Aboriginal clothing
History of Western Australia